

People
Omar Dia, a former Senegalese basketball player who competed for Senegal at the 1980 Summer Olympics
Oumar Dia, an African refugee who was murdered in Denver by white supremacists in 1997